The Balsam Branch Wildlife Area is a  tract of protected land in central Polk County, Wisconsin, managed by the Wisconsin Department of Natural Resources (WDNR). The wildlife area is characterized by marshland, prairie fields, and a pond set in the center of the property.

Overview
In 1967, the entire plot of land was donated to the WDNR to be conserved, with a focus on the stock of turkey, deer, and various waterfowl native to Wisconsin. The property is frequented by birdwatchers.

References

External links
 U.S. Geological Survey Map at the U.S. Geological Survey Map Website. Retrieved February 3, 2023.
 Balsam Branch Wildlife Area Map at the WDNR Website. Retrieved February 3, 2023.

State Wildlife Area
Protected areas of Wisconsin
Geography of Polk County, Wisconsin
Protected areas established in 1967
IUCN Category V